Neena Varakil (born 2 May 1991) is a former Indian athlete who competed internationally in the long jump event.

Life 
Neena Varakil was born on May 2, 1991 at Meppayur, Calicut which is also known as Kozhikode.

In 2017 her personal best was 6.66m which she achieved in Bangalore in July 2016. She took gold in 2017 when she jumped 6.37m in the sixth and final round. This was at the Asian Grand Prix Athletics Meet in Jiaxing in China. She gained a silver medal at 2017 Asian Athletics Championships – Women's long jump when her compatriot, Nayana James, took bronze.

In August 2018, she took a silver medal at the long jump at the Asian Games in Jakarta. At her fourth attempt she jumped 6m 51 cm. The gold medal was taken by Thi Thu Thao Bui of Vietnam and the bronze went to Xiaoling Xu of China. After the event she said that she was stepping back from competition to concentrate on her family. Varakil is married to Pinto Mathew who is an international hurdler. Varakil had helped her train for the Jakarta event as she was not happy with the national coach Bedros Bedrosian.

References

21st-century Indian women
21st-century Indian people
Indian female long jumpers
1991 births
Living people
Athletes from Kerala
Sportswomen from Kerala
Athletes (track and field) at the 2018 Commonwealth Games
Athletes (track and field) at the 2018 Asian Games
Asian Games silver medalists for India
Asian Games medalists in athletics (track and field)
Medalists at the 2018 Asian Games
Commonwealth Games competitors for India